European Handball Championship may refer to
 European Men's Handball Championship
 European Women's Handball Championship